The Brotherhood of Steel is a fictional organization from the post-apocalyptic Fallout video game franchise. The Brotherhood collects and preserves technology, but they are not known for sharing their knowledge, even if doing so would improve the quality of life among the people of the wasteland.

The Brotherhood faction has been present in every Fallout game to date.

Structure

Due to the fragmented nature of the Brotherhood, existing in multiple Expeditionary Forces (known as "Chapters"), a set structure is hard to follow. All Chapters follow a chain of command known as "The Chain That Binds", with four ranks used universally by all. These are, in ascending importance, Initiate, Knight, Paladin, and Elder.

All Chapters stem from the original Western Brotherhood seen in Fallout: A Post Nuclear Role Playing Game, and usually take on names relating to their location, such as the Appalachian Brotherhood (Fallout 76), Mojave Chapter (Fallout: New Vegas), and the Eastern Brotherhood (Fallout 3 and Fallout 4).

Within each Chapter, a separate group exists known as Scribes. These individuals are responsible for all logistical matters within each Chapter. Members of the Order of Swords are responsible for the maintenance of advanced weaponry and the Power Armor so frequently used by the organisation. The Order of Shields are responsible for reverse engineering civilian technology for defensive purposes. The Order of Scrolls are responsible for the recovery/acquisition of advanced schematics and pre-war knowledge in the form of books and other media.

The Brotherhood have been shown to have an Internal Affairs division, known as the Circle of Steel. At least one member is known to have been sent after a rogue Elder in the Fallout: New Vegas add-ons Old World Blues and Dead Money.

Development 
The Brotherhood was created by R. Scott Campbell, who stated that he "simply wanted a group exactly like the monks from the Guardian Citadel in Wasteland". He stated that he "really wanted the player to be able to befriend and join up with this group (and grab all of their awesome gear, of course)". He added that while "this did make them similar to concepts in Gamma World and Warhammer 40K, he professed that he "just loved the idea of high-tech knights in power-armor", calling their creation "total fan service to me".

Appearances 
The Brotherhood of Steel made its first appearance in the original Fallout video game and has been present in every entry in the series since. It is also the central faction of two spin-off titles, Fallout Tactics: Brotherhood of Steel and Fallout: Brotherhood of Steel.

The depictions of the Brotherhood have greatly varied. They are first shown to be an enigmatic, militaristic cult that the protagonist may join in Fallout, who can be critical to defeating the Master, the main antagonist. The Brotherhood has a different appearance in Fallout 2, where they are shown to have outposts throughout the wasteland and are in cooperation with the New California Republic.

In Fallout 3, the East Coast Brotherhood of Steel were portrayed as an altruistic organization dedicated to protecting the wastelanders from raiders and super mutants. The diversion in ideology has caused a splinter group to emerge called the Brotherhood Outcasts, who have no interest in assisting wastelanders but instead pursuing the Brotherhood’s original mission of confiscating pre-War technology.

Other chapters, like the Mojave chapter in Fallout: New Vegas, remained isolationist and were chiefly focused on obtaining pre-War technologies and often used extreme measures to obtain them, such as terrorizing wastelanders and even becoming embroiled in a war with the New California Republic before the events of the game. The war with the NCR has left the chapter very weakened with around half of their paladins and knights lost after the NCR invaded the Mojave chapter’s original headquarters in a decisive victory. Depending on the player character’s actions in New Vegas, the Mojave Brotherhood chapter can maintain a status quo, make peace with the NCR, or be destroyed. 

By the time Arthur Maxson succeeded Owen Lyons as Elder of the Eastern chapter during the events of Fallout 4, the Brotherhood had reverted to their original mission of confiscating and reverse engineering lost pre-war technology, reunified with the Outcasts, and re-established contact with their superiors on the West Coast. The Brotherhood are one of the pivotal factions in Fallout 4, and players may choose to either side with them or join another faction to eliminate the Brotherhood in order to progress the narrative of the game's main storyline.

The Brotherhood are heavily featured in the Steel Dawn update to Fallout 76, as part of an expansion pack called Fractured Steel. In that game, it is led by Paladin Leila Rahmani, who "arrived from California" with her troops "to establish a new Appalachian chapter".

Promotion and merchandise
A Brotherhood of Steel member clad in Power Armor is featured as part of a range of Fallout-themed Funko Pop figurines which were first released in 2015.

Reception 
Patricia Hernandez of Kotaku called the Brotherhood in Fallout 4 "giant dicks", saying that she refrained from stealing until she met them. Saying that they are "overzealous assholes" who "just stormed into the Commonwealth, acting like they own the place", she also states that "they feel that they are entitled to every significant piece of technology out in the wasteland". She criticizes their fictional ideology as not even "making any sense", saying that while it is "supposed to be about the preservation and protection of technology", "their leader, Elder Maxson, takes this to mean that the Brotherhood must destroy all synths". She also criticizes the fact that the player must destroy the Institute if they side with the Brotherhood despite their seemingly similar goals. Citing the "distasteful things they have you do during their faction quests", she singles out Proctor Teagan, who sends you on a "revolting quest where you have to force farmers to give crops to the Brotherhood, regardless of whether or not they want to".

Brendan Lowry of Windows Central called the Brotherhood's quest line in Fallout 4 morally grey, saying that while "The Minutemen are the "good guys" [...] and the Institute are unquestionably evil", "the Brotherhood is the only faction [...] that makes you critically think." Saying that "when the Brotherhood arrives in the Commonwealth, they make a promise to defend the people living there", things start to change later, and the Brotherhood "shows its enemies no mercy" regardless of whether they are hostile. Lowry states that "there's a strong argument to be made both for and against the Brotherhood's ideology".

Controversy arose among fans due to a retcon of the Brotherhood in the plot of Fallout 76. Despite established Fallout lore stating that "first recorded activity from the Brotherhood of Steel was in California in the year 2134," Fallout 76 establishes a Brotherhood presence "in West Virginia in the year 2102", something that "should be downright implausible if not impossible". Bethesda explained this discrepancy with the use of a "functioning satellite" that allowed the Brotherhood of Steel to extend their reach to Appalachia.

See also 
Knights Templar
Space marine

External links
Brotherhood of Steel at The Vault, the Fallout wiki

References 

Bethesda characters
Fallout (series)
Fictional cults
Fictional monks
Military of the United States in fiction